Hans-Joachim Voth (born March 31, 1968) is a German economic historian. He joined the University of Zurich economics faculty in 2014 and has been the Scientific Director of the UBS Center for Economics in Society since 2017. In 2022, he was elected as a Fellow of the Econometric Society.

Early life and education
Voth studied at Bonn and Freiburg Universities, before receiving an M.Sc. at Oxford University in 1996.  After a stint at the European University Institute in Florence, he graduated with a Ph.D. from Nuffield College, Oxford, in 1996. His dissertation won both the Alexander Gerschenkron Prize for best dissertation in international economic history from the Economic History Association (EHA) in 1996 and the 1999 Gino Luzzatto Prize for best dissertation by the European Historical Economics Society (EHES).

Career
Voth was a Research Fellow at Clare College, Cambridge, from 1995 to 1996. He started to work at the international management consultancy McKinsey in 1996, serving clients in the financial sector. After a visiting professorship at the Stanford Economics Department (1997/98), Voth joined Pompeu Fabra University in 1998. Since 2003, Voth was a full professor of economics at Pompeu Fabra University. He was also a Research Professor at ICREA, the Catalan Institution for Research and Advanced Studies. and a Research Affiliate at CREI. In 2001-02 and 2002-03, he was a visiting professor at the Economics Department, MIT. In 2014, he left UPF to become a professor of macroeconomics and financial markets at the University of Zurich.

Voth served as a joint managing editor of the Economic Journal (2015-21), an editor of Explorations in Economic History (2013-15), an Associate Editor of the  Quarterly Journal of Economics (2011-21) and of the Journal of Economic Growth, and of the European Review of Economic History (2008-12). He is also a Fellow of the Royal Historical Society and a Research Fellow at the Centre for Economic Policy Research.

Research
Voth has published three academic books:
 Lending to the Borrower from Hell: Debt, Taxes, and Default in the Age of Philip II [with Mauricio Drelichman], Princeton: Princeton University Press, 2014.
 Prometheus Shackled: Goldsmith Banks and England's Financial Revolution after 1700 [with Peter Temin], Oxford/New York: Oxford University Press, 2013. 
 Time and Work in England, 1750-1830, Oxford: Oxford University Press, 2001.
In addition, he has written three trade books and published more than 60 academic articles on economics, financial markets, and economic history. His most recent research is on state capacity, long-run growth, the persistence of culture, sovereign debt in historical perspective, the link between economic crisis and political violence  and the Great Depression and the German Interwar Economy. Voth has also written about time use in industrializing societies.

Distinctions and Honors
Voth has won several prizes. In addition to two prizes for best dissertation and election to the Econometric Society in 2022, he won a Leverhulme Prize Fellowship, the Larry Neal Prize for best paper in Explorations in Economic History in 2010-11 (with Mauricio Drelichman), the Albert Hirschman Award for best writing in global political economy, and the Montias Prize for best paper in the Journal of Comparative Economics in 2020-21 (with Jacopo Ponticelli). His research has attracted external funding of more than €4.3 million, including a European Research Council Advanced Grant. He has delivered the Tawney Memorial Lecture at the EHS, Cambridge, April 2011, the Sir John Hicks Lecture in Oxford, 2016, and the NFR Crafts Lecture in Warwick (2021), as well as keynotes at numerous conferences and workshops.

References

External links
Hans-Joachim Voth - Google Scholar Citations
Official CV
UBS Center | Economics. For society - About

1968 births
Living people
Economic historians
20th-century German historians
Academic staff of the University of Zurich
Economics journal editors
Fellows of the Econometric Society
Alumni of the University of Oxford
21st-century German historians